Belkhara is a village as well as a panchayat in the Arwal district of Bihar, India.[1] It is situated 11 km north east of district headquarters Arwal.

 The village has few historical monuments too, but many of them are mostly unknown to others.

Access
The village is not connected by railways. Private buses and other private transporting owned by individuals are only source of transport. The nearest railway station is at Jehanabad, 44 km away.

Language
Most of the natives here use Magahi as mode of communication. All the official works are carried out in Hindi.

Governing
Belkhara is part of panchayati Raj system. Mr Suryamal Prasad is village Head man

References 

Villages in Arwal district